The following lists events that happened in 2010 in Zimbabwe.

Incumbents
 President: Robert Mugabe 
 Prime Minister: Morgan Tsvangirai 
 First Vice President: Joice Mujuru
 Second Vice President: John Nkomo

Events

References

 
2010s in Zimbabwe
Zimbabwe
Zimbabwe
Years of the 21st century in Zimbabwe